William Turner Davis (August 1, 1901 – June 18, 1988) was an American politician in the state of Florida.

Davis was born in Madison, Florida in 1901 and attended local schools for his primary education. His father, Charles Davis also served in the Florida Senate, and was its president in 1915. He attended Virginia Military Institute and the University of Florida and was admitted to the Florida bar in 1924. Davis served in the Florida State Senate from 1943 to 1961 as a Democratic member for the 10th district. He was the body's president in 1955. He also previously served as mayor of his hometown of Madison. Davis died at the age  of 86 in 1988 after a brief illness and was buried at Oak Ridge Cemetery in Madison.

References

1901 births
1988 deaths
Democratic Party Florida state senators
Pork Chop Gang
20th-century American politicians